The Palestinian Authority Government of October 2002 was a government of the Palestinian National Authority (PA) from October 2002 to April 2003, headed by Yasser Arafat, the President of the Palestinian National Authority. The Cabinet was largely equal to the June Government, from which six Ministers had resigned.

In April 2003,  the next Government led by Prime Minister Mahmoud Abbas was established.

Powers and jurisdiction

Pursuant to the Oslo Accords, the authority of the PA Government was limited to some civil rights of the Palestinians in the West Bank Areas A and B and in the Gaza Strip, and to internal security in Area A and in Gaza.

Members of the Government

See also
Palestinian government

References

Palestinian National Authority governments
2002 establishments in the Palestinian territories
2003 disestablishments in the Palestinian territories
Cabinets established in 2002
Cabinets disestablished in 2003